The abandoned 1939–40 season would have been the 48th season of The Football League. The kick-off in all divisions took place on Saturday 26 August 1939. On Friday 1 September 1939, Germany invaded Poland. On Saturday 2 September 1939, all divisions of the Football League played their third game of the season. These would be the last fixtures before abandonment following the British declaration of war on Germany on Sunday 3 September 1939. Large gatherings of crowds were suspended with the implementation of the Emergency Powers (Defence) Act 1939.

Blackpool were leading the First Division when the season was abandoned.

League tables when season was abandoned

The tables below are reproduced here in the exact form that they can be found at The Rec.Sport.Soccer Statistics Foundation website and in Rothmans Book of Football League Records 1888–89 to 1978–79, with home and away statistics separated.

Match results are drawn from Rothmans for all divisions.

First Division

Results

Maps

Second Division

Results

Maps

Third Division North

Results

Maps

Third Division South

Results

Maps

See also
1939-40 in English football
1939 in association football
1940 in association football

References

English Football League seasons
Eng
1939–40 in English football leagues
Cancelled association football competitions